Bovitrigla is a monotypic genus of marine ray-finned fishes belonging to the family Triglidae, the gurnards and sea robins, one of two genera belonging to the subfamily Pterygotriglinae. Its only species, Bovitrigla acanthomoplate, is found in the western Pacific Ocean.

Taxonomy
Bovitrigla was first described as a genus in 1938 by the American zoologist Henry Weed Fowler when he described its only species, Bovitrigla acanthomoplate, the holotype of which was collected off Point Tagolo Light, near northern Mindanao in the Philippines at 8°47'N, 123°31'15"E by United States Bureau of Fisheries steamer USFS Albatross II. The genus is classified within the subfamily Pterygotriglinae, alongside the rather more speciose Pterygotrigla. The genus name is a combination of bos, meaning "bull" and Trigla, the type genus of the Triglidae, Fowler did not explain this but it may allude to the bull-like appearance of its sizeable head. The specific name acanthomoplate compounds acanthus, meaning "thorn" or "spine" with omos, which means "shoulder" and plate, "blade", alluding to the “long, slender suprascapular spine, flaring out and back”.

Description
Bovitrigla has a pair long spines on the snout and posttemporal bone, as well as spine on the postocular. The first dorsal fin has 8 spines and the second dorsal fin has 11 soft rays while the anal fin has a single spine and 11 soft rays. The soft ray count may be 10 for the second dorsal fin and 11 for the anal fin. The colour of preserved specimens is plain brownish with no black spots.

Distribution and habitat

References

Pterygotriglinae
Taxa named by Henry Weed Fowler
Fish described in 1938
Monotypic fish genera
Monotypic marine fish genera
Monotypic ray-finned fish genera